Gallium(III) iodide  is the inorganic compound with the formula GaI3.  A yellow hygroscopic solid, it is the most common iodide of gallium.  In the chemical vapor transport method of growing crystals of gallium arsenide uses iodine as the transport agent.  In the solid state, it exists as the dimer Ga2I6. When vaporized, its forms GaI3 molecules of D3h symmetry where the Ga–I distance is 2.458 Angstroms.

Gallium triiodide can be reduced with gallium metal to give a green-colored gallium(I) iodide.  The nature of this species is unclear, but it is useful for the preparation of gallium(I) and gallium(II) compounds.

See also
Gallium halides

References

Cited sources

Iodides
Gallium compounds
Metal halides